The 1956 United States Senate election in Idaho took place on November 6, 1956. Incumbent Republican Senator Herman Welker was defeated for re-election by Democratic nominee Frank Church.

Primary elections
Primary elections were held on August 14, 1956.

Democratic primary

Candidates
Frank Church, attorney
Glen H. Taylor, former U.S. Senator
Claude J. Burtenshaw, teacher, Democratic candidate for U.S. Senate in 1950 special election and unsuccessful candidate for Democratic nomination for U.S. Senate in 1954
Alvin McCormack, farmer, unsuccessful candidate for Democratic nomination for U.S. Senate in 1954

Results

Republican primary

Candidates
Herman Welker, incumbent U.S. Senator
William S. Holden, attorney
Ray J. Davis, teacher
John C. Sanborn, former U.S. Representative
Mark L. Streeter, farmer

Results

General election

Campaign
The State Board of Canvassers confirmed Church's narrow victory over Taylor on August 25. Taylor decided to run as a write-in candidate.

Endorsements

Results

See also 
 1956 United States Senate elections

References

Bibliography
 

1956
Idaho
United States Senate